Clinton Osei (born 17 March 2002) is a Ghanaian professional footballer who plays for Hungarian club MTK Budapest II.

Career statistics

.

References

External links

2002 births
Living people
Ghanaian footballers
Ghanaian expatriate footballers
Association football forwards
MTK Budapest FC players
Nemzeti Bajnokság I players
Expatriate footballers in Hungary
Ghanaian expatriate sportspeople in Hungary